The 2003–04 Luxembourg National Division was the 90th season of top level association football in Luxembourg. The competition ran from 9 August 2003 to 16 May 2004 with Jeunesse Esch winning the title.

Teams

The 2003–04 season saw the National Division's roster of twelve clubs include:
FC Avenir Beggen
F91 Dudelange
FC Etzella Ettelbruck (promoted from the Division of Honour)
CS Grevenmacher
Jeunesse Esch (the reigning champions)
FC Mondercange
US Rumelange
CA Spora Luxembourg (promoted from the Division of Honour)
FC Swift Hesperange
Union Luxembourg
FC Victoria Rosport
FC Wiltz 71

Format
The twelve teams completed the round-robin by playing each other twice (once home and once away) by 4 April.  Then, the league divided into three.  The top four teams were separated from the rest and formed the  'Title group' .  The bottom eight teams were then subdivided into two groups of four, titled  'Relegation group A'  and  'Relegation group B' .  In the event, the top four were Jeunesse Esch, F91 Dudelange, FC Etzella Ettelbruck, and CS Grevenmacher.

In each of the three mini-leagues, each team played each of the three other teams in the mini-league twice (once home and once away).  To these results were added the 22 results of the first stage.  The overall points totals (and goal difference, etc.) were used to determine each club's position in its respective mini-league.

After calculating the final results after 28 games, Jeunesse Esch, the top team in the title group, was declared the league champion.  The fourth-placed team in each of the relegation groups (FC Mondercange and US Rumelange in groups A and B respectively) was relegated to the Division of Honour.

This format is no longer used; the current season, 2006–07 uses a straightforward round-robin.

European qualification
Luxembourg was assigned one spot in the first qualifying round of the UEFA Champions League, for the league champions; it was also assigned two spots in the first qualifying round of the UEFA Cup, for the runners-up and the winners of the Luxembourg Cup.  As league champions, Jeunesse Esch qualified for the Champions League.  F91 Dudelange qualified for the UEFA Cup as runners-up.  In addition, as F91 Dudelange won the Luxembourg Cup and the other finalist (CS Pétange) was not a National Division team, the UEFA Cup spot assigned to the cup winners went to FC Etzella Ettelbruck, who finished third in the league.

First phase

Table

Results

Second phase

Championship stage

Table

Results

Relegation stage

Group A

Table

Results

Group B

Table

Results

Top goalscorers

Team changes for 2004-05 season
The champions and runners-up of the Division of Honour, CS Alliance 01 and CS Pétange, were promoted automatically.  FC Mondercange and US Rumelange were relegated.

References 

Luxembourg National Division seasons
Luxembourg National Division, 2003-04
1